The Premio Planeta de Novela is a Spanish literary prize, awarded since 1952 by the Spanish publisher Grupo Planeta to an original unpublished novel written in Spanish. It is one of about 16 literary prizes given by Planeta.

Financially, it is the most valuable literary award in the world for an author or book, with the winner receiving €1,000,000.  It was created by José Manuel Lara Hernández in 1952 and is awarded on 15 October, St Teresa's day, Teresa being the name of Lara's wife.

Since 1974 there has also been an award to the runner up, which now stands at €150,000.

Criticism 
In recent years its credibility has been called into question, with the first prize often awarded to authors published by Planeta, and the second to less known authors. The award has been declined by Miguel Delibes and Ernesto Sábato, both Planeta authors.

In 2005, an Argentinian court fined Planeta 10,000 pesos after finding that there had been fraud in awarding the Argentinian version of the prize to Ricardo Piglia in 1997.

While the manuscripts are presented under a pseudonym, it is not unusual for the names of the winners to be leaked days or weeks before the official announcement.

List of winners 
Winners listed first, followed by runners up:

See also 
List of literary awards
Spanish literature

References

External links 
Editorial Planeta - Premio Planeta 

Fiction awards
Spanish literary awards
Literary awards honoring unpublished books or writers
Spanish-language literary awards
Awards established in 1952
Planeta literary awards
1952 establishments in Spain